Badr Khan Ustajlu was a Turkoman military officer from the Ustajlu tribe, who served as the tutor (lala) of the Safavid prince Alqas Mirza and as the governor (beglarbeg) of Shirvan from 1538 to 1541 and later from 1543 to 1547 after a second reappointment to the post.

Sources
 
 

Ustajlu
Safavid governors of Shirvan
16th-century deaths
Safavid generals
16th-century people of Safavid Iran